The 2017 Africa Magic Viewers Choice Awards (AMVCA) was held on March 5, 2017 at the Eko Hotels and Suites in Victoria Island, Lagos, Nigeria.

Nominees were revealed on December 14, 2016. In the event, Several top stars and top movies were nominated part of which was the movie ’76 got a record-breaking 14 nominations.

Awards

References

Entertainment events in Nigeria
2017 in Nigerian cinema
Africa Magic
21st century in Lagos
Africa Magic Viewers' Choice Awards ceremonies